Menengai II Geothermal Power Station, is a  geothermal power station under construction in Kenya.

Location
The power station is located in the Menengai Crater, approximately 30 kilometres (19 mi), north of Nakuru, the location of the district headquarters. This is approximately 185 kilometres (115 mi), by road, northwest of Nairobi, the capital and largest city in Kenya. The coordinates of Menengai Crater are:0°11'46.0"S, 36°03'47.0"E (Latitude:-0.196105; Longitude:36.063062).

Overview
The power stations are:

 Menengai I Geothermal Power Station - Owned by Orpower Twenty Two 
 Menengai II Geothermal Power Station - Owned by Quantum Power East Africa
 Menengai III Geothermal Power Station - Owned by Sosian Energy

Ownership
Menengai II Geothermal Power Station, whose construction costs were budgeted at KSh4 billion (approx. US$40 million), is owned by Quantum Power East Africa, an independent power producer (IPP). *US$1.00 = KSh100.80 on 4 April 2016

In February 2021, Afik21 reported that Quantum Power East Africa, the developer of this power station, had been majority acquired by Globeleq, a subsidiary of the CDC Group of the United Kingdom.

See also

 List of power stations in Kenya
 Geothermal power in Kenya

References

External links
Menengai geothermal to save nation KSh 13 billion

Geothermal power stations in Kenya
Power stations in Kenya
Nakuru County
Proposed energy infrastructure